Walker Theatre or Walker Theater may refer to:

 The Madame Walker Theatre Center in Indianapolis, Indiana 
 Burton Cummings Theatre in Winnipeg, Manitoba